Pakradouni (Bagratuni in Eastern Armenian), is a common Armenian surname. It may refer to:

Karim Pakradouni (born 1944), Lebanese-Armenian politician and minister
Hagop Pakradouni (born 1956), Lebanese-Armenian politician
Garabed Pakradouni, Prelate of the Armenian Prelature of Cyprus, 1876–1877

See also
Bagratuni (disambiguation)

Armenian-language surnames